Viva la Juerga is the second album released by Diego's Umbrella.

Track listing
All song written, performed and arranged by Diego's Umbrella.

Personnel
 Tyson Maulhardt - Electric guitar, vocals
 Vaughn Lindstrom - Acoustic guitar, vocals
 Ben Leon - Vocals, electric guitar, percussion
 Marcus Schmidt - Bass
 Jason Kleinberg - Violin, vocals, accordion
 Jake Wood - Drums

Production
 Produced by Diego's Umbrella
 Recorded at Prairie Sun Studios, San Pablo Recorders and Awesometown
 Engineered by Bond Bergland
 Mastered by Michael Romanowski

External links

2007 albums
Diego's Umbrella albums